Sidewaulk is the third studio album by folk rock band Capercaillie.

Track listing
 "Alasdair Mhic Cholla Ghasda" (Trad. Arr. Capercaillie) – 2:30
 "Balindore" – 4:00
 "Fisherman's Dream" (John Martyn) – 3:56
 "Sidewaulk Reels" – 4:49
 "Iain Ghlinn' Cuaich" (Trad. Arr. Capercaillie) – 3:20
 "Fosgail an Dorus/Nighean Bhuidh' Ruadh" (Trad. Arr. Capercaillie) – 3:00
 "The Turnpike" – 6:30
 "Both Sides the Tweed" (Dick Gaughan) – 4:57
 "The Weasel" – 5:17
 "Oh Mo Dhùthaich" (Trad. Arr. Capercaillie) – 2:44

Capercaillie (band) albums
1989 albums
Scottish Gaelic music